Pádraic Moylan (born 2002) is an Irish hurler. At club level he plays with Dicksboro and at inter-county level with the Kilkenny senior hurling team.

Career

Moylan first played hurling at juvenile and underage levels with the Dicksboro club, while also playing as a schoolboy with St. Kieran's College.  He won a Kilkenny MHC title with Dicksboro in 2019. Moylan has also lined out with DCU Dóchas Éireann in the Fitzgibbon Cup.

Moylan first appeared on the inter-county scene as a member of the Kilkenny minor hurling team that lost the 2018 All-Ireland minor final to Galway. He was also part of the minor team that lost the 2019 All-Ireland minor final to Galway. Moylan subsequently progressed to the under-20 team and was team captain when Kilkenny beat Limerick in the 2022 All-Ireland under-20 final.

Moylan first played for the senior team during the 2023 Walsh Cup.

Honours

Dicksboro
Kilkenny Minor Hurling Championship: 2019

Kilkenny
All-Ireland Under-20 Hurling Championship: 2022 (c)
Leinster Under-20 Hurling Championship: 2022 (c)

References

2002 births
Living people
Dicksboro hurlers
Kilkenny inter-county hurlers